Lesnoy is a rural locality (a settlement) in Bobrovsky Selsoviet, Pervomaysky District, Altai Krai, Russia. The population was 808 as of 2013. There are 11 streets.

Geography 
Lesnoy is located 21 km from Novoaltaysk, 50 km from Barnaul.

References 

Rural localities in Pervomaysky District, Altai Krai